Curetis barsine is a species of butterfly belonging to the lycaenid family. It is found in the Australasian realm.

Subspecies
C. b. barsine (Ambon, Sergang)
C. b. egena (C. & R. Felder, [1865]) (Bachan, Halmahera)
C. b. solita Butler, 1882 (Bismarck Archipelago, Solomons)
C. b. ribbei Röber, 1886 (Aru)
C. b. menestratus Fruhstorfer, 1908 (New Guinea)
C. b. galinthias  Fruhstorfer, 1908 (Waigeu)
C. b. eberalda  Fruhstorfer, 1908 (Aru, Kai Island)
C. b. fergussoni  Chapman, 1915 (Fergusson Island)

References

External links
"Curetis Hübner, [1819]" at Markku Savela's Lepidoptera and Some Other Life Forms. Retrieved June 3, 2017.

barsine
Butterflies described in 1860
Butterflies of Indonesia
Taxa named by Baron Cajetan von Felder